Robert Bonsall Pike was Bishop of Meath from 1959 until his death on 27 December 1973.

Born on 19 October 1905, educated at Trinity College, Dublin and ordained in 1930 he began his career with a curacy at Drumcree.

He was then  Curate-in-charge of Aghavilly. He married H. K. Joan Moffat Wilson (1917-2005) on 21 April 1938 at St Brigid's Church, Stillorgan. He held incumbencies at Maryborough, Ballyfin, and Dysart Enos, was Rural Dean of Aghade and then Dean of Ossory (1957–1959) before his ordination to the episcopate.

Notes

1905 births
1973 deaths
Alumni of Trinity College Dublin
Deans of Ossory
Anglican bishops of Meath
Deans of Kilkenny
20th-century Anglican bishops in Ireland